Dolmabahçe Palace located in the Beşiktaş district of Istanbul, Turkey, on the European coast of the Bosporus strait, served as the main administrative center of the Ottoman Empire from 1856 to 1887 and from 1909 to 1922 (Yıldız Palace was used in the interim period).

History 

Dolmabahçe Palace was ordered by the Empire's 31st Sultan, Abdülmecid I, and built between the years 1843 and 1856. Previously, the Sultan and his family had lived at the Topkapı Palace, but as the medieval Topkapı was lacking in contemporary style, luxury, and comfort, as compared to the palaces of the European monarchs, Abdülmecid decided to build a new modern palace near the site of the former Beşiktaş Sahil Palace, which was demolished. Hacı Said Ağa was responsible for the construction works, while the project was realized by architects Garabet Balyan, his son Nigoğayos Balyan and Evanis Kalfa (members of the Armenian Balyan family of Ottoman court architects).

The construction cost five million Ottoman gold lira, or 35 tonnes of gold, the equivalent of ca. $1.9 billion in today's (2021) gold values. This sum corresponded to approximately a quarter of the yearly tax revenue. Actually, the construction was financed through debasement, by massive issue of paper money, as well as by foreign loans. The huge expenses placed an enormous burden on the state purse and contributed to the deteriorating financial situation of the Ottoman Empire, which eventually defaulted on its public debt in October 1875, with the subsequent establishment in 1881 of financial control over the "sick man of Europe" by the European powers.

The palace was home to six Sultans from 1856, when it was first inhabited, up until the abolition of the Caliphate in 1924: The last royal to live here was Caliph Abdülmecid Efendi. A law that went into effect on March 3, 1924, transferred the ownership of the palace to the national heritage of the new Turkish Republic. Mustafa Kemal Atatürk, the founder and first President of the Republic of Turkey, used the palace as a presidential residence during the summers and enacted some of his most important works here. Atatürk spent the last days of his medical treatment in this palace, where he died on November 10, 1938.

Today, the palace is managed by Milli Saraylar Daire Başkanlığı (Directorate of National Palaces) responsible to the Grand National Assembly of Turkey.

Location 
The site of Dolmabahçe was originally a bay on the Bosporus which was used for the anchorage of the Ottoman fleet. The area was reclaimed gradually during the 18th century to become an imperial garden, much appreciated by the Ottoman sultans; it is from this garden that the name Dolmabahçe (Filled-in Garden) comes from the Turkish dolma meaning "filled" and bahçe meaning "garden." Various small summer palaces and wooden pavilions were built here during the 18th and 19th centuries ultimately forming a palace complex named Beşiktaş Waterfront Palace. The area of 110,000 m2 is confined by Bosporus on the east side, while a steep precipice bounds it on the west side, such that after the building of the new 45,000 m2 monoblock Dolmabahçe Palace a relatively limited space has remained for a garden complex which would normally surround such a palace.

Design and layout 

Dolmabahçe is the largest palace in Turkey.

The design contains eclectic elements from the Baroque, Rococo and Neoclassical styles, blended with traditional Ottoman architecture to create a new synthesis. The palace layout and décor reflect the increasing influence of European styles and standards on Ottoman culture and art during the Tanzimat period. The exterior, in particular the view from the Bosporus, shows a classical European two-wing arrangement which is divided by a big avant-corps with two side avant-corps.

Functionally, on the other hand, the palace retains elements of traditional Ottoman palace life, and also features of traditional Turkish homes. It is strictly separated structurally in a southern wing (Mabeyn-i Hümâyûn, or Selamlık, the quarters reserved for the men) which contains the public representation rooms, and a northern wing (Harem-i Hümâyûn, the Harem) serving as the private residential area for the Sultan and his family. Since the harem had to be completely isolated from the outside world, the main entrance for the visitors is located on the narrow southern side. There, the representation rooms are arranged for receptions of visitors and of foreign diplomats. The harem area includes eight interconnected apartments for the wives of the sultan, for his favourites and concubines, and for his mother, each with its own bathroom.

Décor and equipment 

Whereas the Topkapı Palace has exquisite examples of Iznik tiles and Ottoman carving, the Dolmabahçe palace is extensively decorated with gold and crystal. Fourteen tonnes of gold were used to gild the ceilings. Over 100 kg of gold was used to decorate the palac, this weight today costs US$6 million.

The world's largest Bohemian crystal chandelier is in the Ceremonial Hall. It has 750 lamps and weighs 4.5 tonnes. The chandelier was originally assumed to have been a gift from Queen Victoria; in 2006, however, a receipt was discovered showing it had been paid for in full by the Sultan.

Dolmabahçe has the largest collection of Bohemian and Baccarat crystal chandeliers in the world. The famous Crystal Staircase has the shape of a double horseshoe and is built of Baccarat crystal, brass and mahogany.

Expensive stones such as Marmara (Proconnesian) marble, Egyptian alabaster (calcite, also known as onyx-marble), and Porphyry from Pergamon were used for the decoration.

The palace includes a large number of Hereke palace carpets made by the Hereke Imperial Factory. The Hereke carpet featured in the main hall happens to be the largest Hereke rug in the world. Also featured are 150-year-old bearskin rugs originally presented to the Sultan as a gift by Tsar Nicholas I.

A collection of 202 oil paintings is on display in the palace. A highlight of the collection are 23 paintings by Ivan Aivazovsky which he created as a court painter during his stays in Istanbul. The collection also includes paintings by Gustave Boulanger, Jean-Léon Gérôme, Eugène Fromentin, Stanisław Chlebowski, Félix Ziem, Karl Joseph Kuwasseg, Fausto Zonaro, Théo van Rysselberghe and Alexander Sandor Svoboda. There are also paintings by Turkish painters such as Osman Hamdi Bey, Halil Pasha and Osman Nuri Pasha in this art museum.

From the very beginning, the palace's equipment implemented the highest technical standards. Gas lighting and water-closets were imported from Great Britain, whereas the palaces in continental Europe were still lacking these features at that time. Later, electricity, a central heating system and an elevator were installed.

Rooms

Medhal (Main Entrance) Hall 
A visit to the Dolmabahçe Palace begins at the Medhal Hall. Rooms leading off the Medhal are towards the sea and the land. The rooms facing the sea were used by the leading Ottoman officials, the Grand Vizier and the other state ministers, while the rooms facing the land were used by various administrators of the palace and the state, such as the Palace Marshall, Şeyhülislam, and members of the House of Representatives (Meclis-i Mebusan) and the Senate (Meclis-i Ayan).

Guests would first wait in this hall and then would be led inside at the proper time by a palace protocol officer. On entering the Medhal, one sees Boulle tables on both sides of the room, which bear the monogram of Sultan Abdülmecid on top. The royal monogram of the sultan is also on the fireplace. The English chandelier hanging in the middle of this room has sixty arms. The Hereke fabrics used as upholstery for the furniture and as draperies are in the royal shade of red.

The secretariat's rooms 
The second room after the Medhal to the right is the Clerk's Hall, also referred to as the Tiled Room. The largest painting in the palace collection, a depiction of the Surre Procession by Stefano Ussi, hangs on the left wall of this hall. Surre was used to refer to the caravans which travelled from Istanbul to Mecca during the religious month of Recep, bearing the monetary aid used to support the maintenance and the decoration of the Kaaba and to provide financial assistance to the local population of Hejaz.

On the wall to the right is a painting signed by Rudolf Ernst depicting the fire at the Paris Municipal Theater and another painting of a Dutch Village Girl by Delandre. Decorated with French style furniture, this room also contains very valuable porcelain vases.

Atatürk's room 
Mustafa Kemal Atatürk spent the last days of his life in the palace as his health deteriorated. He died at 9:05 A.M. on November 10, 1938, in a bedroom located in the former harem area of the palace. All the clocks in the palace were stopped and set to 9:05 after his death. The clocks outside of his room now are set to the actual time in Turkey, but the clock in the room in which he died still points to 9:05.

Harem 

The harem was a traditional feature of many Middle Eastern architectural structures throughout history. The point of Abdulmecid's construction of the harem was to ensure there were separate quarters built for the Royal family and their leisure. It was common practice for the Sultan's personal concubines to reside within the harem. Rooms meant to house and educate the children of the Sultan as well as the Sultan's own living quarters are included in what would be considered the harem.

Usually most Sultans beforehand had restricted their wives and concubines from being in the public, however Abdulmecid unprecedentedly allowed them to leave the palace to shops and bazaars under supervision.

Gates

Gate of the Sultan

Gate of the Treasury

Gate to the Bosporus

Adjacent buildings 

A number of further residential buildings are located near the palace including the palace of the Crown Prince (Veliaht Dairesi), the quarters of the gentlemen-in-waiting (Musahiban Dairesi), the dormitories of the servants (Agavat Dairesi, Bendegan Dairesi) and of the guards (Baltacılar Dairesi), the quarters of the Chief Eunuch (Kızlarağası Dairesi). Further buildings include imperial kitchens (Matbah-i Amire), stables, an aviary (Kusluk), a plant nursery (Fidelik), a flour mill, a greenhouse (Sera), a Hereke carpet workshop (Hereke dökümhanesi), a glass manufactory, a foundry, a pharmacy etc.

A baroque style mosque designed by Garabet Balyan was built near the palace in 1853–1855. It was commissioned by queen mother Bezm-i Âlem Valide Sultan. Since 1948 the building housed the Naval Museum, but the museum was moved to another location in 1960 after the coup d'état of May, 27th. In 1967 the mosque was returned for worship.

A clock tower (Dolmabahçe Saat Kulesi) was erected in front of the Imperial Gate (Saltanat Kapisi) on a square along the European waterfront of Bosporus next to the mosque. The tower was ordered by Sultan Abdülhamid II and designed by the court architect Sarkis Balyan between 1890 and 1895. Its clock was manufactured by the French clockmaker house of Jean-Paul Garnier, and installed by the court clock master Johann Mayer.

See also
 List of Baroque residences

Literature 

 
 
 
 
 
 
 İskender Pala. The Jewel on the Bosphorus; Dolmabahçe Palace. TBMM Milli Saraylar Yayınları, Istanbul, 2006.
 İhsan Yücel, Sema Öner, F. Yaşar Yılmaz, Cengiz Göncü, Hakan Gülsün. Dolmabahçe Palace. TBMM Milli Saraylar Yayınları, Istanbul, 2005.
 İpek Fitöz. European Lights In Dolmabahçe Palace. TBMM Milli Saraylar Yayınları, Istanbul, 2007.

References

External links 

 National Palaces in Turkey  official site

 
Ottoman palaces in Istanbul
Museums in Istanbul
Garabet Amira Balyan buildings
Nigoğayos Balyan buildings
Houses completed in 1856
Bosphorus
Government of the Ottoman Empire
Mustafa Kemal Atatürk
Baroque Revival architecture in Turkey
Landmarks in Turkey
Beşiktaş
Presidential palaces in Turkey
Historic house museums in Turkey